Shirang may refer to:
 Shirang, Burma
 Shirang-e Olya, Golestan Province, Iran
 Shirang-e Sofla, Golestan Province, Iran
 Shirang Rural District, in Golestan Province, Iran
 Shirang, Kohgiluyeh and Boyer-Ahmad, Iran